Isotopy may refer to:

Mathematics

Homotopy#Isotopy, a continuous path of homeomorphisms connecting two given homeomorphisms is an isotopy of the two given homeomorphisms in homotopy
Regular isotopy of a link diagram, an equivalence relation in knot theory
Ambient isotopy (or h-isotopy), two subsets of a fixed topological space are ambient isotopic if there is a homeomorphism, isotopic to the identity map of the ambient space, which carries one subset to the other
Isotopy of quasigroups. See Quasigroup#Homotopy and isotopy.
Isotopy of loops, a triple of maps with certain properties.
Isotopy of an algebra, a triple of maps with certain properties.

Semiotics

Isotopy,  a repetition of a basic meaning-trait (seme); the direction taken by an interpretation of the text

See also
Isotopic (disambiguation)
Isotope (disambiguation)